Morgan House is a historic home located Central, Pickens County, South Carolina.  It was built in 1893 in the Queen Anne, and modified about 1917 with Classical Revival style changes.  It is a -story frame dwelling and features a porch with Doric order columns.  It is associated with the Morgan family, who operated a mercantile retail establishment and founders of the Bank of Central.

The house now serves as the home of the Central History Museum, which is operated by the Central Heritage Society.

It was listed on the National Register of Historic Places in 2001.

References

External links
 central History Museum - Central Heritage Society

Houses on the National Register of Historic Places in South Carolina
Houses completed in 1893
Neoclassical architecture in South Carolina
Queen Anne architecture in South Carolina
Houses in Pickens County, South Carolina
National Register of Historic Places in Pickens County, South Carolina
Central, South Carolina
Museums in Pickens County, South Carolina